Emile Alphonse Griffith (February 3, 1938 – July 23, 2013) was a professional boxer from the U.S. Virgin Islands who won world titles in three weight divisions. He held the world light middleweight, undisputed welterweight, and middleweight titles. His best-known contest was a 1962 title match with Benny Paret. Griffith won the bout by knockout; Paret never recovered consciousness and died in the hospital 10 days later.

In 1963 and 1964, Griffith was voted Fighter of the Year by The Ring magazine and the Boxing Writers Association of America. In 2002, he was listed #33 on Ring Magazine's list of 80 greatest fighters of the past 80 years. Griffith currently ranks #127 in BoxRec's ranking of the greatest pound for pound boxers of all time. He was inducted into the International Boxing Hall of Fame in the inaugural class of 1990.

Career

Amateur
As a teen he was working at a hat factory on a steamy day when his boss, the factory owner, agreed to Griffith's request to work shirtless. When the owner, a former amateur boxer, noticed his frame, he took Griffith to trainer Gil Clancy's gym.

Griffith won the 1958 New York Golden Gloves 147 lb Open Championship. Griffith defeated Osvaldo Marcano of the Police Athletic Leagues Lynch Center in the finals to win the Championship. In 1957 Griffith advanced to the finals of the 147-lb Sub-Novice division and was defeated by Charles Wormley of the Salem Crescent Athletic Club. Griffith trained at the West 28th Street Parks Department Gym in New York City.

Professional
Griffith turned professional in 1958 and fought frequently in New York City. He captured the Welterweight title from Cuban Benny "The Kid" Paret by knocking him out in the 13th round on April 1, 1961. Six months later, Griffith lost the title to Paret in a narrow split decision. Griffith regained the title from Paret on March 24, 1962, in the controversial bout after which Paret died (see below).

Griffith waged a classic four-fight series with Luis Rodríguez, losing their second fight and winning the other three. He defeated middleweight contender Holly Mims but was knocked out in one round by Rubin "Hurricane" Carter. Three years later, on April 25, 1966, he faced middleweight champion Dick Tiger and won a 15-round unanimous decision and the middleweight title. He also lost, regained and then lost the middleweight crown in three classic fights with Nino Benvenuti.

But many boxing fans believed he was never quite the same fighter after Paret's death. From the Paret bout to his retirement in 1977, Griffith fought 80 bouts but only scored twelve knockouts. He later admitted to being gentler with his opponents and relying on his superior boxing skills because he was terrified of killing someone else in the ring. Many thought that Griffith fought past his prime, only winning nine of his last twenty three fights. Other boxers whom he fought in his career included world champions American Denny Moyer, Cuban Luis Rodríguez, Argentine Carlos Monzón, Cuban José Nápoles, and in his last title try, German Eckhard Dagge. After 18 years as a professional boxer, Griffith retired with a record of 85 wins (25 by knockout), 24 losses and 2 draws.

Benny Paret

Griffith and Paret's third fight, which was nationally televised by ABC, occurred on March 24, 1962, at Madison Square Garden. Griffith had been incensed by an anti-gay slur directed at him by Paret during the weigh-in. Paret touched Griffith's buttocks and whispered into his opponent's ear "maricón, maricón", Spanish slang for "faggot". Griffith had worked in a women's hat factory and at the time designed hats. Griffith had to be restrained from attacking Paret on the spot. The media at the time either ignored the slur or used euphemisms such as "anti-man". Griffith's girlfriend asked him about the incident, saying, "I didn't know about you being that way."

In the sixth round Paret came close to stopping Griffith with a multi-punch combination, but Griffith was saved by the bell. After the sixth round Griffith's trainer, Gil Clancy, later said he told him, "When you go inside I want you to keep punching until Paret holds you or the referee breaks you! But you keep punching until he does that!".

In round 12 Griffith trapped Paret in a corner. Stunned after taking hard blows to the head, Paret stopped punching back and slumped to the side against the ropes, although his upper body was through them and partly out of the ring. Griffith held his opponent's shoulder keeping him in position while using his free hand to hit Paret, who was no longer trying to protect himself by head movement or an arm guard. Griffith repeatedly landed right uppercuts on Paret's head. Many watching were shocked, and there were calls from ringside for the referee to halt the bout; Norman Mailer said it was the hardest he had ever seen one man hit by another. Paret then lolled back and was hit with a combination.

At this point Ruby Goldstein stepped in, thereby awarding Griffith a win by technical knockout. Immediately after the referee intervened, Paret, who had remained on his feet throughout, slowly slid to the floor. He was carried from the ring on a stretcher and died ten days later in hospital without regaining consciousness. Goldstein had a reputation as a tender-minded referee who stopped bouts at an early stage; admirers said he may have been suffering after-effects from a heart attack. Paret's manager was also criticized for not retiring his boxer with a timely throwing in of the towel during the beating.

Griffith told a television interviewer: "I'm very proud to be the welterweight champion again. I hope Paret is feeling very good." When the seriousness of the situation become known, Griffith went to the hospital where Paret was being treated and unsuccessfully attempted for several hours to gain entry to Paret's room. Following that, he ran through the streets while being insulted by passersby. He would later receive hate mail from Paret supporters who were convinced Griffith intentionally killed Paret.

New York Governor Nelson Rockefeller created a seven-man commission to investigate the incident and the sport. Griffith reportedly felt guilt over Paret's death and suffered nightmares about Paret for 40 years.

The fight, and the widespread publicity and criticism of boxing which accompanied it, became the basis of the 2005 documentary Ring of Fire: The Emile Griffith Story.

Trainer
Griffith trained other boxers, including Wilfred Benítez and Juan Laporte of Puerto Rico. Both won world championships. Griffith, Monzon, Benvenuti, Rodriguez, Tiger, Nápoles and Benítez are members of the International Boxing Hall of Fame. In 1979–80, he was in Denmark serving as the coach of the Danish Olympic boxing team.

Personal life

In 1971, two months after they met, Griffith married another Virgin Islander Mercedes "Sadie" Donastorg, who was then a member of the dance troupe "Prince Rupert and the Slave Girls". Griffith adopted Donastorg's daughter, but the marriage only lasted a few months. After retiring from boxing, Griffith worked as a corrections officer at the Secaucus, New Jersey Juvenile Detention Facility.

In 1992, Griffith was viciously beaten and almost killed on a New York City street after leaving a gay bar near the Port Authority Bus Terminal. He was in the hospital for four months after the assault.  It was not clear if the violence was motivated by homophobia.

Griffith was bisexual. He was quoted in Sports Illustrated as saying "I like men and women both. But I don't like that word: homosexual, gay or faggot. I don't know what I am. I love men and women the same, but if you ask me which is better ... I like women."

Death
A long-time resident of Weehawken, New Jersey, Griffith died July 23, 2013, at a care facility in Hempstead, New York. In his final years, he required full-time care and suffered from dementia pugilistica. His adopted son, Luis Rodrigo Griffith, was his primary caregiver. He was buried in St. Michael's Cemetery, Queens, New York City.

Media representations

 In January 2005, filmmakers Dan Klores and Ron Berger premiered their documentary Ring of Fire: The Emile Griffith Story at the Sundance Film Festival in Utah. It was broadcast on television on USA Network.
 Griffith's December 20, 1963 bout with Rubin Carter (which Griffith lost) is depicted in the opening scene of the 1999 motion picture The Hurricane. Griffith is portrayed by former boxer Terry Claybon, while actor Denzel Washington stars as Carter.
 In May 2012 it was announced that trumpeter Terence Blanchard and playwright Michael Cristofer were working on the opera Champion, based on Griffith's story. It premiered at Opera Theatre of St. Louis on June 15, 2013.
 Irish director Lenny Abrahamson is working on a biopic focusing on Griffith's rivalry with Paret to be released in 2019.
 A stage play based on Griffith's story, titled Brown Girl in the Ring, premiered on September 26, 2016, in Chicago. It was commissioned and produced by the Court Theatre.
 A stage play based on Griffith's story, titled Man in the Ring, premiered on November 16, 2018, at the Huntington Theater in Boston.

Professional boxing record

{|class="wikitable" style="text-align:center"
|-
!
!Result
!Record
!Opponent
!Type
!Round, time
!Date
!Location
!Notes
|-
|112
|Loss
|85–24–2 
|align=left| Alan Minter
|PTS
|10
|Jul 30, 1977
|align=left|
|align=left|
|- align=center
|111
|Loss
|85–23–2 
|align=left| Mayfield Pennington
|SD
|10
|Jul 16, 1977
|align=left|
|align=left|
|- align=center
|110
|Loss
|85–22–2 
|align=left| Joel Bonnetaz
|PTS
|10
|Apr 15, 1977
|align=left|
|align=left|
|- align=center
|109
|Win
|85–21–2 
|align=left| Christy Elliott
|MD
|10
|Feb 2, 1977
|style="text-align:left;"| 
|align=left|
|- align=center
|108
|Win
|84–21–2 
|align=left| Frank Reiche
|TKO
|10 (10)
|Dec 4, 1976
|align=left|
|align=left|
|- align=center
|107
|Win
|83–21–2 
|align=left| Dino Del Cid
|TKO
|4 (10)
|Oct 24, 1976
|align=left|
|align=left|
|- align=center
|106
|Loss
|82–21–2 
|align=left| Eckhard Dagge
|MD
|15
|Sep 18, 1976
|align=left|
|align=left|
|- align=center
|105
|Draw
|82–20–2 
|align=left| Bennie Briscoe
|PTS
|10
|Jun 26, 1976
|align=left|
|align=left|
|- align=center
|104
|Loss
|82–20–1 
|align=left| Loucif Hamani
|UD
|10
|Feb 9, 1976
|style="text-align:left;"| 
|align=left|
|- align=center
|103
|Win
|82–19–1 
|align=left| Jose Roberto Chirino
|UD
|10
|Nov 7, 1975
|align=left|
|align=left|
|- align=center
|102
|Loss
|81–19–1 
|align=left| Elijah Makathini
|PTS
|10
|Aug 9, 1975
|align=left|
|align=left|
|- align=center
|101
|Win
|81–18–1 
|align=left| Leo Saenz
|UD
|10
|Jul 23, 1975
|style="text-align:left;"| 
|align=left|
|- align=center
|100
|Loss
|80–18–1 
|align=left| Jose Luis Duran
|UD
|10
|May 31, 1974
|align=left|
|align=left|
|- align=center
|99
|Win
|80–17–1 
|align=left| Donato Paduano
|UD
|10
|Dec 10, 1974
|style="text-align:left;"| 
|align=left|
|- align=center
|98
|Loss
|79–17–1 
|align=left| Vito Antuofermo
|UD
|10
|Nov 22, 1974
|style="text-align:left;"| 
|align=left|
|- align=center
|97
|Win
|79–16–1 
|align=left| Bennie Briscoe
|MD
|10
|Oct 9, 1974
|style="text-align:left;"| 
|align=left|
|- align=center
|96
|Win
|78–16–1 
|align=left| Renato Garcia
|PTS
|10
|May 25, 1974
|align=left|
|align=left|
|- align=center
|95
|Loss
|77–16–1 
|align=left| Tony Licata
|UD
|12
|Feb 5, 1974
|style="text-align:left;"| 
|align=left|
|- align=center
|94
|Loss
|77–15–1 
|align=left| Tony Mundine
|UD
|12
|Nov 19, 1973
|align=left|
|align=left|
|- align=center
|93
|Win
|77–14–1 
|align=left| Manuel González
|MD
|10
|Nov 1, 1973
|style="text-align:left;"| 
|align=left|
|- align=center
|92
|Loss
|76–14–1 
|align=left| Carlos Monzón
|UD
|15
|Jun 2, 1973
|align=left|
|align=left|
|- align=center
|91
|Draw
|76–13–1 
|align=left| Nessim Max Cohen
|PTS
|10
|Mar 12, 1973
|style="text-align:left;"| 
|align=left|
|- align=center
|90
|Loss
|76–13 
|align=left| Jean-Claude Bouttier
|DQ
|7 (10)
|Dec 18, 1972
|style="text-align:left;"| 
|style="text-align:left;"|
|- align=center
|89
|Win
|76–12 
|align=left| Joe DeNucci
|SD
|12
|Oct 11, 1972
|style="text-align:left;"| 
|align=left|
|- align=center
|88
|Win
|75–12 
|align=left| Joe DeNucci
|SD
|10
|Sep 16, 1972
|style="text-align:left;"| 
|align=left|
|- align=center
|87
|Win
|74–12 
|align=left| Ernie Lopez
|UD
|10
|Mar 30, 1972
|style="text-align:left;"| 
|align=left|
|- align=center
|86
|Win
|73–12 
|align=left| Jacques Kechichian
|PTS
|10
|Feb 21, 1972
|style="text-align:left;"| 
|align=left|
|- align=center
|85
|Win
|72–12 
|align=left| Armando Muñíz
|UD
|10
|Jan 31, 1972
|style="text-align:left;"| 
|align=left|
|- align=center
|84
|Win
|71–12 
|align=left| Danny McAloon
|UD
|10
|Dec 10, 1971
|style="text-align:left;"| 
|align=left|
|- align=center
|83
|Loss
|70–12 
|align=left| Carlos Monzón
|TKO
|14 (15), 2:32
|Sep 25, 1971
|style="text-align:left;"| 
|align=left|
|- align=center
|82
|Win
|70–11 
|align=left| Nessim Max Cohen
|UD
|10
|Jul 26, 1971
|style="text-align:left;"| 
|align=left|
|- align=center
|81
|Win
|69–11 
|align=left| Ernie Lopez
|MD
|10
|May 3, 1971
|style="text-align:left;"| 
|align=left|
|- align=center
|80
|Win
|68–11 
|align=left| Rafael Gutierrez
|UD
|10
|Mar 23, 1971
|style="text-align:left;"| 
|align=left|
|- align=center
|79
|Win
|67–11 
|align=left| Juan Ramos
|TKO
|7 (10)
|Mar 5, 1971
|style="text-align:left;"| 
|align=left|
|- align=center
|78
|Win
|66–11 
|align=left| Nate Collins
|UD
|10
|Nov 10, 1970
|style="text-align:left;"| 
|align=left|
|- align=center
|77
|Win
|65–11 
|align=left| Danny Perez
|UD
|12
|Oct 17, 1970
|style="text-align:left;"| 
|align=left|
|- align=center
|76
|Win
|64–11 
|align=left| Dick Tiger
|UD
|10
|Jul 15, 1970
|style="text-align:left;"| 
|align=left|
|- align=center
|75
|Win
|63–11 
|align=left| Tom Bogs
|PTS
|10
|Jun 4, 1970
|style="text-align:left;"| 
|align=left|
|- align=center
|74
|Win
|62–11 
|align=left| Carlos Marks
|UD
|12
|Mar 11, 1970
|style="text-align:left;"| 
|align=left|
|- align=center
|73
|Win
|61–11 
|align=left| Doyle Baird
|UD
|10
|Jan 28, 1970
|style="text-align:left;"| 
|align=left|
|- align=center
|72
|Loss
|60–11 
|align=left| José Nápoles
|UD
|15
|Oct 17, 1969
|style="text-align:left;"| 
|align=left|
|- align=center
|71
|Win
|60–10 
|align=left| Art Hernandez
|SD
|10
|Aug 15, 1969
|style="text-align:left;"| 
|align=left|
|- align=center
|70
|Win
|59–10 
|align=left| Dick DiVeronica
|TKO
|7 (10), 1:28
|Jul 11, 1969
|style="text-align:left;"| 
|align=left|
|- align=center
|69
|Win
|58–10 
|align=left| Stanley Hayward
|UD
|12
|May 12, 1969
|style="text-align:left;"| 
|align=left|
|- align=center
|68
|Win
|57–10 
|align=left| Andy Heilman
|UD
|10
|Feb 3, 1969
|style="text-align:left;"| 
|align=left|
|- align=center
|67
|Loss
|56–10 
|align=left| Stanley Hayward
|SD
|10
|Oct 29, 1968
|style="text-align:left;"| 
|align=left|
|- align=center
|66
|Win
|56–9 
|align=left| Gypsy Joe Harris
|UD
|12
|Aug 6, 1968
|style="text-align:left;"| 
|align=left|
|- align=center
|65
|Win
|55–9 
|align=left| Andy Heilman
|MD
|12
|Jun 11, 1968
|style="text-align:left;"| 
|align=left|
|- align=center
|64
|Loss
|54–9 
|align=left| Nino Benvenuti
|UD
|15
|Mar 4, 1968
|style="text-align:left;"| 
|align=left|
|- align=center
|63
|Win
|54–8 
|align=left| Remo Golfarini
|TKO
|6 (10)
|Dec 15, 1967
|style="text-align:left;"| 
|
|- align=center
|62
|Win
|53–8 
|align=left| Nino Benvenuti
|MD
|15
|Sep 29, 1967
|style="text-align:left;"| 
|align=left|
|- align=center
|61
|Loss
|52–8 
|align=left| Nino Benvenuti
|UD
|15
|Apr 17, 1967
|style="text-align:left;"| 
|align=left|
|- align=center
|60
|Win
|52–7 
|align=left| Joey Archer
|UD
|15
|Jan 23, 1967
|style="text-align:left;"| 
|align=left|
|- align=center
|59
|Win
|51–7 
|align=left| Joey Archer
|MD
|15
|Jul 13, 1966
|style="text-align:left;"| 
|align=left|
|- align=center
|58
|Win
|50–7 
|align=left| Dick Tiger
|UD
|15
|Apr 25, 1966
|style="text-align:left;"| 
|align=left|
|- align=center
|57
|Win
|49–7 
|align=left| Johnny Brooks
|UD
|10
|Feb 3, 1966
|style="text-align:left;"| 
|align=left|
|- align=center
|56
|Win
|48–7 
|align=left| Manuel González
|UD
|15
|Dec 10, 1965
|style="text-align:left;"| 
|align=left|
|- align=center
|55
|Win
|47–7 
|align=left| Harry Scott
|RTD
|7 (10)
|Oct 4, 1965
|style="text-align:left;"| 
|align=left|
|- align=center
|54
|Win
|46–7 
|align=left| Gabe Terronez
|TKO
|4 (10), 2:45
|Sep 14, 1965
|style="text-align:left;"| 
|align=left|
|- align=center
|53
|Loss
|45–7 
|align=left| Don Fullmer
|UD
|12
|Aug 19, 1965
|style="text-align:left;"| 
|style="text-align:left;"|
|- align=center
|52
|Win
|45–6 
|align=left| Eddie Pace
|UD
|10
|Jun 14, 1965
|style="text-align:left;"| 
|align=left|
|- align=center
|51
|Win
|44–6 
|align=left| Jose Stable
|UD
|15
|Mar 30, 1965
|style="text-align:left;"| 
|align=left|
|- align=center
|50
|Loss
|43–6 
|align=left| Manuel González
|SD
|10
|Jan 26, 1965
|style="text-align:left;"| 
|align=left|
|- align=center
|49
|Win
|43–5 
|align=left| Dave Charnley
|TKO
|9 (10), 1:56
|Dec 1, 1965
|style="text-align:left;"| 
|align=left|
|- align=center
|48
|Win
|42–5 
|align=left| Brian Curvis
|UD
|15
|Sep 22, 1964
|style="text-align:left;"| 
|align=left|
|- align=center
|47
|Win
|41–5 
|align=left| Luis Manuel Rodríguez
|SD
|15
|Jun 12, 1964
|style="text-align:left;"| 
|align=left|
|- align=center
|46
|Win
|40–5 
|align=left| Stan Harrington
|KO
|4 (10), 1:40
|Apr 14, 1964
|style="text-align:left;"| 
|
|- align=center
|45
|style="background: #DDD"|NC
|39–5 
|align=left| Juan Carlo Duran
|NC
|7 (10)
|Mar 11, 1964
|style="text-align:left;"| 
|style="text-align:left;"|
|- align=center
|44
|Win
|39–5
|align=left| Ralph Dupas
|KO
|3 (12)
|Feb 10, 1964
|style="text-align:left;"| 
|align=left|
|- align=center
|43
|Loss
|38–5
|align=left| Rubin Carter
|TKO
|1 (10), 2:13
|Dec 20, 1963
|style="text-align:left;"| 
|align=left|
|- align=center
|42
|Win
|38–4
|align=left| Jose Monon Gonzalez
|MD
|10
|Oct 5, 1963
|style="text-align:left;"| 
|align=left|
|- align=center
|41
|Win
|37–4
|align=left| Holly Mims
|UD
|10
|Aug 10, 1963
|style="text-align:left;"| 
|align=left|
|- align=center
|40
|Win
|36–4
|align=left| Luis Manuel Rodríguez
|SD
|15
|Jun 8, 1963
|style="text-align:left;"| 
|align=left|
|- align=center
|39
|Loss
|35–4
|align=left| Luis Manuel Rodríguez
|UD
|15
|Mar 21, 1963
|style="text-align:left;"| 
|align=left|
|- align=center
|38
|Win
|35–3
|align=left| Christian Christensen
|TKO
|9 (15)
|Feb 3, 1963
|style="text-align:left;"| 
|align=left|
|- align=center
|37
|Win
|34–3
|align=left| Jorge Fernandez
|TKO
|9 (15)
|Dec 8, 1962
|style="text-align:left;"| 
|align=left|
|- align=center
|36
|Win
|33–3
|align=left| Ted Wright
|PTS
|15
|Oct 17, 1962
|style="text-align:left;"| 
|align=left|
|- align=center
|35
|Win
|32–3
|align=left| Don Fullmer
|UD
|10
|Oct 6, 1962
|style="text-align:left;"| 
|align=left|
|- align=center
|34
|Win
|31–3
|align=left| Denny Moyer
|SD
|10
|Aug 18, 1962
|style="text-align:left;"| 
|align=left|
|- align=center
|33
|Win
|30–3
|align=left| Ralph Dupas
|UD
|15
|Jul 13, 1962
|style="text-align:left;"| 
|align=left|
|- align=center
|32
|Win
|29–3
|align=left| Benny Paret
|TKO
|12 (15), 2:09
|Mar 24, 1962
|style="text-align:left;"| 
|align=left|
|- align=center
|31
|Win
|28–3
|align=left| Johnny Torres
|UD
|10
|Feb 3, 1962
|style="text-align:left;"| 
|align=left|
|- align=center
|30
|Win
|27–3
|align=left| Isaac Logart
|MD
|10
|Dec 23, 1961
|style="text-align:left;"| 
|align=left|
|- align=center
|29
|Win
|26–3
|align=left| Stanford Bulla
|KO
|4 (10), 2:35
|Nov 4, 1961
|style="text-align:left;"| 
|align=left|
|- align=center
|28
|Loss
|25–3
|align=left| Benny Paret
|SD
|15
|Sep 30, 1961
|style="text-align:left;"| 
|align=left|
|- align=center
|27
|Win
|25–2
|align=left| Yama Bahama
|UD
|10
|Jul 29, 1961
|style="text-align:left;"| 
|align=left|
|- align=center
|26
|Win
|24–2
|align=left| Gaspar Ortega
|TKO
|12 (15), 0:48
|Jun 3, 1961
|style="text-align:left;"| 
|align=left|
|- align=center
|25
|Win
|23–2
|align=left| Benny Paret
|KO
|13 (15), 1:11
|Apr 1, 1961
|style="text-align:left;"| 
|align=left|
|- align=center
|24
|Win
|22–2
|align=left| Luis Manuel Rodríguez
|SD
|10
|Dec 17, 1960
|style="text-align:left;"| 
|align=left|
|- align=center
|23
|Win
|21–2
|align=left| Willie Toweel
|TKO
|8 (10), 3:00
|Oct 22, 1960
|style="text-align:left;"| 
|align=left|
|- align=center
|22
|Win
|20–2
|align=left| Florentino Fernández
|UD
|10
|Aug 25, 1960
|style="text-align:left;"| 
|align=left|
|- align=center
|21
|Win
|19–2
|align=left| Jorge Fernandez
|UD
|10
|Jul 25, 1960
|style="text-align:left;"| 
|align=left|
|- align=center
|20
|Win
|18–2
|align=left| Jorge Fernandez
|SD
|10
|Jun 3, 1960
|style="text-align:left;"| 
|align=left|
|- align=center
|19
|Loss
|17–2
|align=left| Denny Moyer
|SD
|10
|Apr 26, 1960
|style="text-align:left;"| 
|align=left|
|- align=center
|18
|Win
|17–1
|align=left| Denny Moyer
|SD
|10
|Mar 11, 1960
|style="text-align:left;"| 
|align=left|
|- align=center
|17
|Win
|16–1
|align=left| Gaspar Ortega
|SD
|10
|Feb 12, 1960
|style="text-align:left;"| 
|align=left|
|- align=center
|16
|Win
|15–1
|align=left| Roberto Peña
|UD
|10
|Jan 8, 1960
|style="text-align:left;"| 
|align=left|
|- align=center
|15
|Win
|14–1
|align=left| Ray Lancaster
|TKO
|7 (10), 1:44
|Nov 23, 1959
|style="text-align:left;"| 
|align=left|
|-
|14
|Loss
|13–1
|align=left| Randy Sandy
|SD
|10
|Oct 26, 1959
|style="text-align:left;"| 
|align=left|
|- align=center
|13
|Win
|13–0
|align=left| Kid Fichique
|UD
|10
|Aug 7, 1959
|style="text-align:left;"| 
|align=left|
|- align=center
|12
|Win
|12–0
|align=left| Willie Stevenson
|UD
|10
|May 25, 1959
|style="text-align:left;"| 
|align=left|
|- align=center
|11
|Win
|11–0
|align=left| Mel Barker
|UD
|10
|Apr 27, 1959
|style="text-align:left;"| 
|align=left|
|- align=center
|10
|Win
|10–0
|align=left| Bobby Shell
|UD
|10
|Mar 23, 1959
|style="text-align:left;"| 
|align=left|
|- align=center
|9
|Win
|9–0
|align=left| Barry Allison
|TKO
|5 (10), 2:44
|Feb 23, 1959
|style="text-align:left;"| 
|align=left|
|- align=center
|8
|Win
|8–0
|align=left| Willie Joe Johnson
|TKO
|5 (6), 1:52
|Feb 9, 1959
|style="text-align:left;"| 
|align=left|
|- align=center
|7
| Win
|7–0
|align=left| Gaylord Barnes
|TKO
|5 (6), 1:46
|Jan 26, 1959
|style="text-align:left;"| 
|align=left|
|- align=center
|6
| Win
|6–0
|align=left| Larry Jones
|KO
|5 (6), 2:17
|Dec 15, 1958
|style="text-align:left;"| 
|align=left|
|- align=center
|5
| Win
|5–0
|align=left| Sergio Rios
|KO
|3 (6), 1:01
|Nov 17, 1958
|style="text-align:left;"| 
|align=left|
|- align=center
|4
| Win
|4–0
|align=left| Artie Cunningham
|PTS
|6
|Oct 6, 1958
|style="text-align:left;"| 
|align=left|
|- align=center
|3
| Win
|3–0
|align=left| Tommy Leaks
|PTS
|4
|Jul 21, 1958
|style="text-align:left;"| 
|align=left|
|- align=center
|2
| Win
|2–0
|align=left| Bruce Gibson
|PTS
|4
|Jun 23, 1958
|style="text-align:left;"| 
|align=left|
|- align=center
|1
| Win
|1–0
|align=left| Joe Parham
|PTS
|4
|Jun 2, 1958
|style="text-align:left;"| 
|align=left|

Honors
 Named The Ring Fighter of the Year for 1964.
 A park has been named in Griffith's honor in his native US Virgin Islands.

See also
 List of welterweight boxing champions
 List of light middleweight boxing champions
 List of middleweight boxing champions
 List of WBC world champions
 List of WBA world champions
 List of undisputed boxing champions
 List of boxing triple champions

References

Further reading
 Lance Pugmire, "Emile Griffith dies at 75; champion boxer struggled with his sexuality" "LA Times", July 23, 2013
 Ron Ross, ""Nine...Ten...and Out! The Two Worlds of Emile Griffith" 2008
 Donald McRae, "The Night Boxer Emile Griffith Answered Gay Taunts with a Deadly Cortege of Punches," The Guardian, September 10, 2015.

External links
 
 
 

|-

|-

|-

|-

|-

|-

|-

|-

|-

|-

|-

|-

|-

|-

|-

|-

|-

|-

|-

|-

|-

|-

|-

 Ring Memorabilia
 'Ring of Fire' Connects With True Story of A Fatal Blow Washington Post article April 20, 2005
 Emile Griffith – CBZ Profile
 World Boxing Association History
 National Boxing Association's Quarterly Ratings: 1961 - BoxRec
 National Boxing Association's Quarterly Ratings: 1962 - BoxRec
 NYSAC World Welterweight Title (Boxing)

1938 births
2013 deaths
Deaths from dementia in New York (state)
International Boxing Hall of Fame inductees
Middleweight boxers
People from Saint Thomas, U.S. Virgin Islands
People from Weehawken, New Jersey
United States Virgin Islands male boxers
Welterweight boxers
World boxing champions
African-American boxers
American male boxers
Sportspeople with chronic traumatic encephalopathy
LGBT African Americans
American LGBT sportspeople
Bisexual men
Bisexual sportspeople
LGBT boxers
20th-century African-American sportspeople
21st-century African-American people